William F. Kimball (September 25, 1908 – May 4, 1962) served for a time as majority leader in the Arizona State Senate and was an unsuccessful candidate for governor of Arizona in 1956.  He was the father of Arizona politician Richard Kimball.

Sources
Arizona Republic article about Richard Kimball's run for the U.S. senate
Mention of Bill Kimball's death

Arizona state senators
1908 births
1962 deaths
20th-century American politicians